Kang County or Kangxian is a county in the southeast of Gansu province, China. It is under the administration of Longnan City. The county was formed in 1928 as Wudu County, but renamed to Kang County the next year, named after the northern Zhou Dynasty place Kangzhou.

Administrative divisions
As of 2019, the county was subdivided in 18 towns and 3 townships.
Towns

-Towns are upgraded from Township.

Townships
 Miba Township()
 Dianzi Township()
 Taishi Township()

Demographics
The county is majority Han, with Hui, Manchu, Zhuang, Tibetan, Mongolian, Yao, and Uygur minority groups. The total population is 203,400 people.

Climate

Economy
The economy of Kangxian is mainly based around agriculture. Crops of major importance are wheat, corn, potatoes, soybeans, and white beans. The county is also a major producer of edible mushrooms such as black wood ear, it also produces a domestically popular Longshen green tea, walnuts, mulberry and silkworm cocoons. In recent years, eco-tourism has become of some importance.

See also
 List of administrative divisions of Gansu

References

County-level divisions of Gansu
Longnan